Pseudominolia is a genus of sea snails, marine gastropod mollusks in the subfamily Umboniinae of the family Trochidae, the top snails.

Species
Species within the genus Pseudominolia include:
 Pseudominolia articulata (Gould, 1861)
 Pseudominolia biangulosa (A. Adams, 1854)
 Pseudominolia climacota (Melvill, 1897)
 Pseudominolia gradata (G. B. Sowerby III, 1895)
 Pseudominolia musiva H. Nevill & G. Nevill, 1871
 Pseudominolia nedyma (Melvill, 1897)
 Pseudominolia splendens (G.B. Sowerby, 1897)
 Pseudominolia tramieri Poppe, Tagaro & Dekker, 2006
Species brought into synonymy
 Pseudominolia musiva (Gould, 1861): synonym of Conotalopia musiva (Gould, 1861)

References

External links
 Herbert D.G. (1992). Revision of the Umboniinae (Mollusca: Prosobranchia: Trochidae) in southern Africa and Mozambique. Annals of the Natal Museum 33(2):379-459

 
Trochidae
Gastropod genera